Darkvision may refer to:

 Darkvision (Dungeons & Dragons), a sense in Dungeons & Dragons
 Darkvision (novel), a fantasy novel by Bruce R. Cordell